Charles James Goode (born 3 August 1995) is an English professional footballer who plays as a centre-back for  club Blackpool, on loan from  club Brentford.

A graduate of the Fulham Academy, Goode began his senior career in non-League football, before breaking into League football with Scunthorpe United in 2015. A loan to Northampton Town in January 2019 led to a permanent move to the club at the end of the 2018–19 season. Following victory in the 2020 League Two play-off final, Goode transferred to Championship club Brentford, with whom he was promoted to the Premier League in 2021. He was capped by England C at international level.

Club career

Early career
Goode began his youth career as a forward, before being moved back through midfield to right back. After a spell with hometown club Watford, he joined the Fulham Academy at the age of 10 and was released at age 16 in 2012. Goode dropped into non-League football and after a season with Harefield United U18, he gained his first experience of senior football with Hadley, A.F.C. Hayes and Hendon between 2013 and 2015. He was a part of the 2014–15 Hendon squad which reached the Isthmian League Premier Division play-off final and won the 2014–15 Isthmian League Cup and London Senior Cup. A growth spurt during the 2014–15 season saw Goode move from right back to central defence.

Scunthorpe United
On 10 June 2015, Goode joined League One club Scunthorpe United on a free transfer and signed a two-year contract, with the option of a further year. He failed to fully establish himself during four seasons at Glanford Park and by the time of his departure in July 2019, he had made 85 appearances and scored six goals.

Northampton Town
As a result of falling down the pecking order at Scunthorpe United, on 31 January 2019, Goode joined League Two club Northampton Town on loan until the end of the 2018–19 season. During what remained of the season, he made 17 appearances and signed a three-year contract with the club for an undisclosed fee on 3 July 2019. Goode was named team captain for the 2019–20 season and made 45 appearances and scored four goals during a campaign which culminated in promotion to League One, after victory in the 2020 League Two play-off Final. He was voted the club's 2019–20 Supporters' Player of the Year, was named in the League Two PFA Team of the Year and was nominated for the September and October 2019 PFA Fans' Player of the Month awards. On 18 August 2020, Goode departed Northampton Town for a club-record fee. During 18 months at Sixfields, he made 62 appearances and scored four goals.

Brentford
On 18 August 2020, Goode signed for Championship club Brentford and signed a four-year contract, with the option of a further year, for an undisclosed fee reported to be in excess of £1 million. Competing with Mads Bech Sørensen for third place in the centre back pecking order, Goode played sparingly during the opening months of the 2020–21 season. After a period out with illness, he returned to match play in mid-December 2020, but then spent another period out of the squad until returning to full fitness in March 2021. Goode made four late-season appearances, but did not appear during Brentford's 2021 EFL playoff campaign. As an unused substitute during the 2–0 victory in the Final over Swansea City, he received a promotion medal.

Goode made his first appearance of the 2021–22 season with a start in a EFL Cup third round match versus Oldham Athletic and his performance in the 7–0 win was recognised with a place in the EFL Cup Team of the Round. In early November 2021, injuries to summer transfers Zanka and Kristoffer Ajer allowed Goode to make a run of Premier League starts. His run was ended by a hamstring injury suffered in late December and he failed to return to the matchday squad prior to his departure on loan for the remainder of the season the final day of the winter transfer window. Linking up with Championship club Sheffield United, Goode was sent off for the first time in his professional career on his second appearance, for a two-footed challenge on Blackburn Rovers attacker Reda Khadra on 23 February 2022. While training during the suspension, he suffered from a knee cartilage problem, which led to his return to Brentford for treatment in April. Goode failed to return to fitness before the end of the season and was not involved in the Blades' unsuccessful playoff campaign.

The knee cartilage problem saw Goode miss Brentford's entire 2022–23 pre-season and the first half of the regular season. He was included in the squad for the mid-season training camp and made one friendly appearance during the period. Goode returned to the matchday squad on Boxing Day 2022 and remained an unused substitute during a 2–2 draw with Tottenham Hotspur. He failed to win any further first team call-ups before joining Championship club Blackpool on loan until the end of the 2022–23 season on 23 January 2023. Goode immediately went into the starting lineup, but a hamstring injury suffered on his third appearance saw him return to Brentford for scans.

International career
Goode was capped once by England C, as a second-half substitute in a 2–1 friendly victory over Republic of Ireland U21 on 1 June 2015.

Personal life
Goode's father and brother Ben also became footballers. He is an Arsenal supporter. Goode attended Bushey Meads School and during his career in non-League football, he worked in his family's business, installing electric blinds.

Career statistics

Honours
Hendon
Isthmian League Cup: 2014–15
London Senior Cup: 2014–15

Northampton Town
EFL League Two play-offs: 2020

Brentford
EFL Championship play-offs: 2021

Individual
Harefield United U18 Players' Player of the Year: 2012–13
Northampton Town Supporters' Player of the Year: 2019–20
League Two PFA Team of the Year: 2019–20

References

External links
Charlie Goode at brentfordfc.com
Charlie Goode at blackpoolfc.co.uk

1995 births
Living people
English footballers
Association football defenders
Hadley F.C. players
A.F.C. Hayes players
Hendon F.C. players
Scunthorpe United F.C. players
Northampton Town F.C. players
Brentford F.C. players
Sheffield United F.C. players
Southern Football League players
Isthmian League players
English Football League players
Premier League players
England semi-pro international footballers
People educated at Bushey Meads School
Blackpool F.C. players